Azad-e-Olya (also Romanized as Āzād-e-‘Olyā; also known as Azad, Āzād-e Bālā, and Āzadhar) is a village in Mojezat Rural District, in the Central District of Zanjan County, Zanjan Province, Iran. At the 2006 census, its population was 432, in 92 families.

References 

Populated places in Zanjan County